Borasi is a surname of Italian origin. Notable people with this surname include:

 Benjamín Borasi (born 1997), Argentine professional footballer 
 Giovanna Borasi (born 1971), Italian architect and Director of the Canadian Centre for Architecture (CCA) in Montreal

See also 
 Borås (disambiguation)

Italian-language surnames